Aleksey Valerevich Kazakov (born 18 May 1976) is a Russian volleyball player.

He was born in Naberezhnye Chelny, Tatar Autonomous Soviet Socialist Republic.

Kazakov was a member of the national team that won the bronze medal at the 2004 Summer Olympics in Athens. Four years earlier in Sydney he gained the silver medal. He is 2.18 metres tall, making him one of the tallest athletes in the world.

References

External links

 
 
 

1976 births
Living people
Russian men's volleyball players
Olympic volleyball players of Russia
Volleyball players at the 1996 Summer Olympics
Volleyball players at the 2000 Summer Olympics
Volleyball players at the 2004 Summer Olympics
Olympic silver medalists for Russia
Olympic bronze medalists for Russia
People from Naberezhnye Chelny
Ural Ufa volleyball players
Olympic medalists in volleyball
Medalists at the 2004 Summer Olympics
Medalists at the 2000 Summer Olympics
Sportspeople from Tatarstan